"C'Mon" is a song by American singer Kesha from her second studio album, Warrior (2012). It was released as the album's second single on November 16, 2012. The song was written by Kesha, Dr. Luke, Benny Blanco, Max Martin, Cirkut, and fellow pop singer and longtime collaborator Bonnie McKee, while production was handled by Dr. Luke, Blanco, and Cirkut. Containing elements of pop rap, "C'Mon" is a techno-pop, bubblegum pop, and dance song with brash lyrics that center on partying and falling in love. Stylistically, the song follows a verse-chorus pattern typical in pop music, with Kesha adding traditional singing in the latter and the discordant enunciation and stresses of vowels to force assonance and rhyme that epitomize her rap technique in the former.

The music video for the song premiered on January 11, 2013, and received positive reviews. "C'Mon" was well received in Canada, Ireland, New Zealand, Australia, Belgium, and the US.

The song peaked at number twenty-seven on the Billboard Hot 100, becoming the first single not to reach the top ten of the chart since her debut single "Tik Tok" reached number one on January 2, 2010, beginning her eight song stretch. However, the single did peak at number nine in the Billboard Pop Songs Charts, making it Kesha's seventh top-ten hit since "Tik Tok". Follow-up single "Crazy Kids" featuring will.i.am or Juicy J brought her mainstream success again in the UK. In Australia, the song obtained moderate success, gaining a Platinum certification with digital sales brimming 70,000 units. Only one Kesha song had reached the top 10 since her previous single, "Die Young". "C'mon" also reached the top ten in Belgium.

The song is included in the fifth edition of the Just Dance series, Just Dance 2014.

Background and composition

"C'Mon" was written by Kesha, Dr. Luke, Max Martin, Bonnie McKee, Benny Blanco, Melin Shikder, and Cirkut, while production was helmed by Dr. Luke, Martin, Cirkut, and Blanco. Registered on the Broadcast Music Incorporated database on October 13, 2012, under the legal title "C Mon", the song was released as the second single from Kesha's second studio album, Warrior. "C'Mon" is a technopop and pop-rap record thematically similar to Kesha's previous single, "Die Young"; Billboard called the song "a YOLO dance jam about taking hookups from the dance floor to the bedroom", while MTV called the track a "...case for a sassy one-night stand." The track begins with harmonized, a cappella male vocals, before breaking into a "crunchy" beat. In "C'Mon"s verse, Kesha sings: "Saw you leaning against that old record machine/ Saw the name of your band written on the marquee/ It's a full moon tonight so we gettin' rowdy/ Yeah, we gettin' rowdy, get-get-gettin' rowdy." The refrain is sung with the lyrics: "C'mon 'cause I know what I like/ And you're looking just like my type/ Let's go for it just for tonight/ C'mon, c'mon, c'mon/ Now don't even try to deny/ We're both going home satisfied/ Let's go for it just for tonight/ C'mon, c'mon, c'mon".

According to the sheet music published at Musicnotes.com, "C'Mon" is written in the key of E major and has a moderate tempo of 126 beats per minute. The song follows a chord progression E–A–Cm–A, and Kesha's vocals span from B3 to E5.

Critical reception
Seventeen gave a positive review of both the song and the video, calling "C'Mon" a "perfect dance jam with a catchy chorus". Carl Williot of Idolator gave a mixed review of the track, calling the song "fun but familiar". The Huffington Post praised the song, calling the chorus "awesome", and stating it could be Kesha's "latest destined-for-smash-y song". Billboard gave a positive review of the song, comparing it to Robyn's "Call Your Girlfriend", as well as Kesha's previous hit "Your Love Is My Drug". Contessa Gayles of AOL said "C'Mon" stayed true to Kesha's trademark half-rapping, half-singing style. Fuse gave the track a positive review, stating that fans of the un-Auto-Tuned "Die Young" would find similar gems in "C'Mon". Mark Hogan blogging for Spin wrote that although Kesha's hedonistic persona in "C'Mon" was marketable, it remained an ordinary electropop song better suited for label-mate Katy Perry, adding that Kesha's party-goer shtick present in previous hits "Tik Tok" and "Take It Off" was starting to become more of a caricature with the release of "C'Mon".

Commercial performance
Weeks prior to being released officially to radio stations in the U.S., "C'Mon" debuted at number 99 on the Billboard Hot 100 and 28 on the Billboard Pop Songs Chart. Upon the release, the song debuted at number 70 on the Digital Songs with 60,000 copies sold. It peaked at number 27 on the Billboard Hot 100, becoming her first solo single to not chart within the top ten in the United States. It has sold 350,000 copies in its first month being released. As of December 13, 2018, the song received a platinum certification in the United States by the nation's Recording Industry Association of America (RIAA), for reaching sales of 1 million units in the country alone.

The song performed poorly in Europe; Ireland is the only country in which it charted well, reaching number 33. On the UK Singles Chart, it peaked at 70, but her follow-up single, "Crazy Kids", was more successful across the continent.

Music video
On December 22, 2012, Kesha confirmed that she was filming the "C'Mon" music video when she posted a picture of herself on set on her Twitter account. The "Awful House" scenes were filmed at the historic Elliston Soda Shop in Nashville, TN. When Kesha quits her job and walks out the front door of "Awful House" in the video, other local businesses on Ellison Place can be seen, albeit out-of-focus. The music video for "C'Mon" was released on January 11, 2013. The music video has surpassed 50 million views on her Vevo channel.

Synopsis
The video opens with Kesha working as waitress at a waffle house named the "Awful House". Wearing pink ribbons, a pink-checkered shirt, and "daisy duke" shorts, Kesha quits her job and jumps into a van called the "Dream Machine" driven by someone in a cat costume. Switching costumes into what MTV considered something more in-tune with Kesha's style, the rapper terrorizes a convenience store with a gang of people dressed in animal costumes. The following scenes depict Kesha on a motorcycle and taking a bath.

Lyric video
The official lyric video was released on December 12, 2012, and features the lyrics flashing, rainbows, kittens, puppies, bunnies, ducklings, unicorns and penguins.

Live performances
Kesha performed "C'Mon" at The X Factor on December 6, 2012, and at MTV's NYE Countdown on January 1, 2013. Kesha also performed "C'Mon" on The Jonathan Ross Show on February 16, 2013, and on Late Night with Jimmy Fallon on February 20, 2013. On March 23, 2013, at the 2013 Kids' Choice Awards, Kesha performed a segment of "We R Who We R" and "C'Mon". Additionally, Kesha performed "C'Mon" at the 2013 Calzedonia Fashion Show. The song was also included in the North American Tour 2013, Kesha's first coheadlining concert tour, and the Warrior Tour, Kesha's second headlining concert tour.

Credits and personnel
Vocals – Kesha
Songwriting – Kesha Sebert, Lukasz Gottwald, Benjamin Levin, Max Martin, Bonnie McKee, Henry Walter
Production – Dr. Luke, Benny Blanco, Cirkut
Credits adapted from the liner notes on BMI.

Track listings
Digital download
"C'Mon" – 3:34

Digital download (remixes EP) 
"C'Mon" – 3:34
"C'Mon" (Wideboys club mix) – 5:51
"C'Mon" (Wideboys radio mix) – 3:52
"C'Mon" (Cutmore club mix) – 6:08
"C'Mon" (Cutmore radio mix) – 3:57

CD
"C'Mon" – 3:34
"Die Young" (Deconstructed mix) – 3:21

Charts

Weekly charts

Year-end charts

Certifications

Release history

References

2012 songs
2013 singles
Kemosabe Records singles
Kesha songs
RCA Records singles
Song recordings produced by Benny Blanco
Song recordings produced by Cirkut (record producer)
Song recordings produced by Dr. Luke
Songs written by Benny Blanco
Songs written by Bonnie McKee
Songs written by Dr. Luke
Songs written by Kesha
Songs written by Max Martin